Yameo is an extinct language from Peba–Yaguan language family that was formerly spoken in Peru.  It was spoken along the banks of the Amazon River from the Tigre River to the Nanay River.

Masamae (Mazán, Parara), spoken the Mazán River in Loreto Department, Peru, is closely related to the Yameo language.

Dialects
Yameo dialects are Napeano, Masamai, Nahuapo, Amaona, Mikeano, Parrano, Yarrapo, Alabono, San Regino (?), Mazan (?), Camuchivo (?) according to Mason (1950).

References

Extinct languages of South America
Peba–Yaguan languages
Languages of Peru